Russia is the fourth largest generator and consumer of electricity in the world. 
Its 440 power stations have a combined installed generation capacity of 220 GW.

Russia has a single synchronous electrical grid encompassing much of the country.
Electricity generation is based largely on gas (46%), coal (18%), hydro (18%), and nuclear (17%) power. 
60% of thermal generation (gas and coal) is from combined heat and power plants. 
Russia operates 31 nuclear power reactors in 10 locations, with an installed capacity of 21 GW.

Despite considerable geothermal and wind resources, this accounts for less than one percent.

History

Tsarist period

The electric power industry first developed in Russia under the Tsarist regime. The industry was highly regulated particularly by the Ministry of Finance, the Ministry of Trade and Industry and the Ministry of Internal Affairs. This led to considerable delay as electrification was not made a priority in the process of industrialisation.

Provisional Government (1917)
The eight months of the provisional government laid the groundwork for a state-owned approach to electrification as part of their move towards a centrally planned economy. They set up the Central Economic Committee.

Soviets electrification

Electrification was a key part of the Bolshevik political programme:

This led to the creation of the GOELRO plan as the first-ever Soviet plan for national economic recovery and development. It was the prototype for subsequent Five-Year Plans drafted by Gosplan. GOELRO is the transliteration of the Russian abbreviation for "State Commission for Electrification of Russia" (Государственная комиссия по электрификации России).

Post Soviet development
After the collapse of the Soviet Union Unified Energy System of Russia RAO UES was founded as state-owned (50%) company. From 1992 to 2008 it was the largest electric power holding company. Four energy companies - Novosibirskenergo, Tatenergo, Irkutskenergo and Bashenergo - managed to avoid incorporation into RAO UES.

Privatization and reform
In 2002, the Russian government began reforming the power sector. The main goal was and remains upgrading the aging and outdated heating and electricity infrastructure. The restructuring involved the separation and privatization of the generation, transmission and sales companies. The grids were brought under regulatory supervision.

Power generation was divided up into seven wholesale generating companies (OGK) – including RusHydro, 14 territorial generating companies (TGK), independents and state-owned entities. OGKs contain power plants and specialize mainly in electric power generation. TGKs contain predominantly combined heat and power plants (CHPs).

The gradual liberalization of the wholesale electricity market, completed in January 2011, now allows producers to charge market prices. The transmission grid remains mostly under state control.

As a result of the reorganization, Inter RAO UES became a major generating company in Russia in the field of export and import of electric power. The total installed capacity of the power plants owned or managed by the company is around 18,000 MW. The company's main types of activities are generation of electric and thermal power, sales of electric and thermal power to consumers and export and import of electric power.

Post-reform developments
Price increase followed the reform process, 3-4 times the margin set by regulatory authorities. In November 2011, then prime minister Vladimir Putin tasked the Ministry for Economic Development (Russia), the Ministry of Energy (Russia) and the 'Federal Tariffs Service' to draft a government resolution restricting the profitability of electric utilities. This "restricted the ability of electric utilities to make money from providing services other than supplying electricity"

As of 2013, Russia had no wholesale electricity market. The Ministry for Energy of Russia, concerned with price increases envisions a wholesale market under bi-lateral contracts between consumers and specific power plants. Inter RAO and Gazprom Energy Holding were lobbying for a different one.

Equipment producers
Power Machines is the leading Russian equipment producer, with a share of over 50%. It unites production, supply, construction, maintenance and modernization of equipment for thermal, nuclear, hydraulic and gas turbine power plants. The following big international energy equipment holdings are well established and have joint ventures or their own production facilities in Russia: General Electric, Siemens, Alstom, ABB, Skoda Power, Mitsubishi Heavy Industries, Ansaldo Energia, and Areva.

Power companies

Territorial generating companies
 TGK-1 - North-West (Leningrad, Murmansk Oblasts and Karelia);
 TGK-2 - north of Central Russia, Vologda and Arkhangelsk Oblasts;
 Mosenergo (TGK-3) - Moscow and Moscow Oblast;
 Quadra (TGK-4) - Black Earth and southern regions of Central Russia (12 Oblasts in all);
 T Plus Group:
 TGK-5 - Kirov Oblast, Udmurtia, Mari El and Chuvashia;
 TGK-6 - east of Central Russia, Penza Oblast;
 TGK-7 - Middle Volga and Orenburg Oblast;
 TGK-9 - Perm Krai, Sverdlovsk Oblast and Komi Republic;
 Lukoil-Ecoenergo (TGK-8) - Southern Federal District;
 Fortum (TGK-10) - Urals Federal District (except for Sverdlovsk Oblast);
 TGK-11 - Omsk and Tomsk Oblasts;
 Siberian Generation Company:
 Kuzbassenergo (TGK-12) - Kemerovo Oblast and Altai Krai;
 Yenisei Territorial Generation Company (TGK-13) - Krasnoyarsk Krai, Khakassia and Tyva;
 TGK-14  - Buryatia and the Trans-Baikal Krai.

Wholesale generating and other companies
 Inter RAO
 OGK-1 - merged into Inter RAO in 2012
 OGK-3 - merged into Inter RAO in 2012
 OGK-2
 OGK-6 - merged into OGK-2 in 2010
 Unipro (OGK-4)
 Enel Russia (OGK-5)
 Irkutskenergo - independent vertically integrated company, it owns the production and distribution facilities supplying the Irkutsk region.
 RusHydro - excluded from the 2003 reform law, as it is considered a strategic asset.
 Rosenergoatom - state-owned company controlling all nuclear power generation assets.

Transmission and distribution companies
 Rosseti
 MOESK - Moscow metropolitan area
 FGC UES

Supply companies
Largest supply companies:
 OJSC First Supply Company
 OJSC Saint Petersburg Supply Company
 OJSC Samaraenergo
 OJSC EK Vostok

Isolated energy systems
Some parts of the country have limited connections to the Russian unified energy system, reducing the likelihood that new companies will enter the energy supply market by importing energy from neighboring energy systems. Those areas, defined as "non-price" zones, include Kaliningrad Oblast, the Komi Republic, Arkhangelsk Oblast, the south of the Sakha Republic, Primorsk Krai, Khabarovsk Krai, Amur Oblast, and the Jewish Autonomous Oblast.

Additionally, some parts of Russia are completely isolated from the unified energy system, including Kamchatka, Magadan Oblast, Sakhalin Oblast, Chukotka and Taimyr Autonomous Okrug, the western and central parts of the Sakha Republic, as well as many remote settlements across the country. Energy prices in "non-price" and isolated regions are exempt from liberalization and remain regulated.

Consumption

In 2008 the end use of electricity was 4.3% (726 TWh) of the world total (16,819 TWh). In 2008 the gross production of electricity was 5.1% (1,038 TWh) of the world total (20,181 TWh).

Mode of production 

According to the IEA the Russian gross production of electricity was 1,038 TWh in 2008 and 930 TWh in 2004 giving the 4th top position among the world producers in 2008. Top ten countries produced 67% of electricity in 2008. The top producers were: 1) United States 21.5% 2) China 17.1% 3) Japan 5.3% 4) Russia 5.1% 5) India 4.1% 6) Canada 3.2% 7) Germany 3.1% 8) France 2.8% 9) Brazil 2.3% and 10) South Korea 2.2%. The rest of the world produced 33%.

Gas
The share of natural gas fuelled electricity was 48% of the gross electricity production in 2008 in Russia (495 TWh / 1,038 TWh.

Coal and peat
The share of coal and peat electricity was 19% of the gross electricity production in 2008 in Russia (187 TWh / 1,038 TWh).

Nuclear power

In 2008 Russian federation was the 4th country by nuclear electricity production with 163 TWh (6% of the world total). 
According to the IEA 15.7% of Russian domestic electricity was generated by nuclear power in 2008.

In 2009 Russia had in total 31 nuclear reactors and installed capacity in 2008 23 GW.

Nuclear reactor construction and export
In 2006 Russia had exported nuclear reactors to Armenia, Bulgaria, Czech Republic, Finland, Hungary, India, Iran, Lithuania, Slovak Republic and Ukraine. In Russia, the average construction time was in 1) 1965-1976 57 months and 2) 1977-1993 72–89 months, but the four plants that have been completed since then have taken around 180 months (15 years), due to increased opposition following the Chernobyl accident and the political changes after 1992.

Hydropower
 hydroelectric power plants generated 167 TWh from a total capacity of 47 GW. 
Russia is the 5th-largest producer of electricity from hydropower in the world, accounting for 5.1% of the world's hydroelectric generation. 
The use of other renewable sources for electricity in 2008 was not significant in the Russian Federation, according to the statistics of the IEA in terms of electricity volume in 2008.

Electricity imports
As of 2010, Russia imports 17.5% of its total electricity consumption, with about 90% originating from Kazakhstan and Georgia. Inter RAO has a monopoly on electricity imports in the country.

Power stations

Electrical grid

The IPS/UPS is a wide area synchronous transmission grid of some CIS countries with a common mode of operation and centralized supervisory control.  It has an installed generation capacity of 300 gigawatts, and produces 1,200 terawatt-hours (TWh) per year for its 280 million customers.  The system spans eight time zones.

Kyoto carbon allowances
The revenues from Kyoto allowances via Joint Implementation projects sales can be significant – in the billions of euros in the cases of Russia. If a number of (relatively strict) criteria were filled JI projects could be implemented during the Kyoto protocol agreement, for which no international third-party checking or UN approval was needed. According to Transparency International a lack of regulation in carbon trading poses the risk of fraud. In 2009 it was not in all cases clear which government organisations had the authority to sell the surplus and how transparently and accountably such transfers of public wealth were carried out.

See also
 IPS/UPS: the unified energy system of Russia and other former Soviet countries
 Energy in Russia
 Energy policy of Russia
 Electric energy markets by country

References

External links
 Post-Soviet Developmentalism and the Political Economy of Russia’s Electricity Sector Liberalization